Wu Qian (born 21 July 1986) is a retired Chinese basketball player. He represented China at the 2007 FIBA Asia Championship. He is an ethnic Sibe.

External links

Sibe people
Living people
1986 births
Chinese men's basketball players
Centers (basketball)
Bayi Rockets players